Paulava Republic was a peasant community in the Polish-Lithuanian Commonwealth with its own parliament, army, and laws.

History 
Paulava Republic was a small self-governing peasant community founded in 1769 by the Catholic priest Paweł Ksawery Brzostowski. The republic ceased to exist in 1795 when, due to the Third Partition of the Polish–Lithuanian Commonwealth, Brzostowski exchanged the manor with Fryderyk Józef Moszyński for properties in Saxony and Dresden.

Moszyński in turn sold the manor to Count de Choiseul-Gouffier in 1799. The new owners tolerated some of the freedoms until Brzostowski's death in 1827. The last freedoms were lost when peasants joined the failed November Uprising in 1830.

Government
The community was governed by Paweł Ksawery Brzostowski, who declared himself President, and Seimas (parliament), which was formed from the local peasants. The republic had its own constitution which was created before the Constitution of 3 May 1791.

Recognition 
The state was recognized by the Grand Duke and King Stanisław August Poniatowski himself. The Great Sejm (1788–1792) also recognized the republic and approved its statute.

Reforms 
Brzostowski implemented various progressive policies – abolished serfdom and granted personal freedoms to the peasants, replaced corvée with a land tax paid in cash, established a school and a pharmacy, encouraged more profitable agricultural activities, e.g. fruit tree gardens and animal husbandry. Brzostowski's revenue from the manor more than doubled.

References

1769 establishments in Europe
1795 disestablishments in Europe
History of Lithuania (1569–1795)